Jean-Pierre Jacquillat (13 July 1935 – 6 August 1986) was a French conductor.

Jacquillat was born in Versailles in 1935.  He was named assistant to Charles Munch at the Orchestre de Paris in 1967.  He was chief conductor of the Iceland Symphony Orchestra.  He made a number of recordings, with that orchestra, the Orchestre de Paris, and others.  His career was cut short when he died in a car accident in 1986 in France, aged 51. In May 1973, Jacquillat conducted the French premiere, and only second production, of Martinů's film-opera Les trois souhaits at the Lyon Opera attended by the composer's widow.

Recordings
His recordings include:
 arr. Joseph Canteloube: Chants d'Auvergne, with Victoria de los Ángeles and the Orchestre Lamoureux, Paris (released under EMI's Great Recordings of the Century series)
 Emmanuel Chabrier: España (Orchestre de Paris)
 Ernest Chausson: Poème de l'amour et de la mer and Chanson perpétuelle, with Victoria de los Ángeles and the Lamoureux Orchestra
 Claude Debussy: Prélude à l'après-midi d'un faune (Orchestre de Paris)
 Paul Dukas: The Sorcerer's Apprentice (Orchestre de Paris)
 Maurice Duruflé: Three dances for orchestra, Op. 6: Divertissement, Danse lente, Tambourin (Sydney Symphony)
 Karólína Eiríksdóttir (b. 1951): Sinfonietta (Iceland Symphony Orchestra) and Five Pieces for Chamber Orchestra (Iceland Chamber Orchestra)
 Reynaldo Hahn: Le Bal de Béatrice d'Este (Orchestre de Paris)
 Claude Joseph Rouget de Lisle arr. Hector Berlioz: La Marseillaise (Orchestre de Paris)
 Wolfgang Amadeus Mozart: Clarinet Concerto, with Einar Johanesson and the Iceland Symphony Orchestra
 Gabriel Pierné: Marche des petits soldats de plomb (March of the Little Lead Soldiers) (Orchestre de Paris)
 Maurice Ravel: Trois poèmes de Mallarmé (Jean-Christophe Benoît and the Orchestre de Paris Ensemble)
 Camille Saint-Saëns: Danse macabre (Orchestre de Paris)
 John Speight: Concerto for Clarinet "Melodious Birds Sing Madrigals", with Einar Johanneson (Iceland Symphony Orchestra).

References

1935 births
1986 deaths
French male conductors (music)
20th-century French conductors (music)
People from Versailles
Road incident deaths in France
20th-century French male musicians